Parliamentary elections were held in Hungary between 17 and 26 July 1887. The result was a victory for the Liberal Party, which won 263 of the 413 seats.

Violence during the election campaign resulted in the death of nine men and twelve people being seriously injured.

Results

References

Hungary
Elections in Hungary
Parliamentary
Elections in Austria-Hungary
Hungary

hu:Magyarországi országgyűlési választások a dualizmus korában#1887